A bow's cast is the distance it can shoot an arrow in archery.

References

Archery